Monica Seles was the reigning champion but did not compete that year.

Amélie Mauresmo won in the final 6–4, 7–5 against Amanda Coetzer.

Seeds
A champion seed is indicated in bold text while text in italics indicates the round in which that seed was eliminated. All sixteen seeds received a bye to the second round.

  Martina Hingis (quarterfinals)
  Conchita Martínez (second round)
  Elena Dementieva (quarterfinals)
  Amanda Coetzer (final)
  Mary Pierce (withdrew)
  Amélie Mauresmo (champion)
  Arantxa Sánchez Vicario (semifinals)
  Chanda Rubin (second round)
  Paola Suárez (third round)
  Meghann Shaughnessy (quarterfinals)
  Amy Frazier (second round)
  Lisa Raymond (third round)
  Jelena Dokić (third round)
  Gala León García (second round)
  Henrieta Nagyová (third round)
  Elena Likhovtseva (third round)

Draw

Finals

Top half

Section 1

Section 2

Bottom half

Section 3

Section 4

External links
 WTA tournament edition details

Amelia Island Championships
2001 WTA Tour